Several species of fungi share the name black morel:

Morchella angusticeps (L.) Pers. (1801)
Morchella conica Pers.
Morchella elata Fr. (1822)
Morchella tomentosa M.Kuo (2008), the black foot morel